Rusky Castle, also known as Ruskie Castle, is a ruined castle on an islet on Loch Rusky, Stirling, Scotland. The islet is now submerged. The castle was known to be held by Sir John de Menteith.

Notes

Ruined castles in Stirling (council area)
Buildings and structures completed in the 13th century
13th-century establishments in Scotland